Iliya Argirov (March 19, 1931 – November 17, 2012) was a prominent Bulgarian folk singer from the Macedonian folklore region and one of the symbols of the Bulgarian folklore music.

Biography 
The first appearances of Iliya Argirov are as a young performer of popular songs from Pirin region. Since 1950 he is on the professional folklore music scene in the Macedonian songs Ensemble "Gotse Delchev". Later he becomes the soloist of the State Ensemble for Folk Songs and Dances "Pirin" in Blagoevgrad, where he works 35 years and participates in concerts in over 50 countries worldwide. During his 50-year career Iliya Argirov has more than 200 recorded songs, 7 albums and numerous participations in compilations of Bulgarian folklore music. He died at the age of 80 in Sofia, November 17, 2012.

Discography

Solo albums 
 1969 –  Popular songs performed by Iliya Argirov / Hародни песни в изпълнение на Илия Аргиров (Published by Balkanton BHA 1151) LP
 1978 – Iliya Argirov / Илия Аргиров (Published by Balkanton) LP
 1981 – 30 years with the songs of Iliya Argirov / 30 години с песните на Илия Аргиров (Published by Balkanton BHA 10776) LP
 1985 – Iliya Argirov / Илия Аргиров (Published by Balkanton BNA 11632) LP
 1994 – Oi, Devoiche / Ой, девойче (Published by Star Records) LP
 1995 – I sing for you mother / За тебе пея майко (Published by Bofirov Music) LP
 2009 – My Songs / Моите песни (Published by Double D Music) LP
 2014 – Bulgarian folklore songs 2 / Български фолклорни песни 2 (Published by Balkanton) LP

As a participant 
Year unknown – HOPO!(Volume II) Bulgarian – Macedonian folk songs and dances (Published by Festival Records – Australia) LP
 1962 – Popular songs (Compilation) / Народни песни (Сборник) (Published by Balkanton BNA 444) LP
 1971 – State Ensemble for Folk Songs and Dances "Pirin" / Държавен ансамбъл за народни песни и танци "Пирин" – Ансамбъл Пирин (Published by Balkanton BHA 1321) LP
 1973 – Popoularni Narodni Pesni, Hora i Ruchenitsi  / "Популарни Народни Песни, Хора и Ръченици"  (Published by Balkanton BHA 1738) LP
 1975 – Folksongs of the Pirin Region / Пирински народни песни (Published by Balkanton) LP
 1979 – State Ensemble for Folk Songs and Dances "Pirin" – Alive like the Homeland / Жива като земята (Published by Balkanton BHA 10352) LP
 1979 – State Ensemble for Folk Songs and Dances "Pirin" – Voices from the Pirin Mountains  /  Гласове от Пирина (Published by Balkanton BHA 10353) LP
 1979 – State Ensemble for Folk Songs and Dances "Pirin" – From the pure sources / От чистите извори (Published by Balkanton BHA 10351) LP
 1984 – State Ensemble for Folk Songs and Dances "Pirin" – Eulogy / – Възпев (Published by Balkanton BHA 11394 ) LP
 1987 – State Ensemble for Folk Songs and Dances "Pirin" – With the songs of Kiril Stefanov /  С песните на Кирил Стефанов (Published by Balkanton BHA 11978/79) LP
 1998 – Bulgarian Folk Dances, Vol. 2 – Various Artists (Published by Balkanton) LP
 2000 – The Magic of Bulgarian Folk Music, Vol.1 – Various Artists (Published by Balkanton) LP
 2002 – Macedonian Songs / Македонски песни  (Published by Balkanton) LP
 2004 – The voices of Bulgaria Pt.2 / Гласовете на България – 2 част (Published by Stefkos Music) LP
 2005 – Bulgarian Folk Heritage /  Българско фолклорно наследство  (Published by Gega New Ltd.) LP
 2007 – The Best Macedonian Songs of Bulgaria / Най-добрите македонски песни на България (Published by Star Records) LP
 2010 – Pirin Folk Songs – Various Artists (Published by Gega New Ltd.) LP
 2012 – Golden Treasure: Folk Songs arranged by Bulgarian Composers, Vol. 2 (Published by Bulgarian National Radio) LP
 2012 – Shopski Narodni Pesni, Vol. 3 / Шопски народни песни 3 част (Published by Bulgarian National Radio) LP

Guest appearances 
 1982 – Folk Songs and Horo Dances Arranged by Kosta Kolev / Народни песни и хора – обработил Коста Колев (Published by Balkanton BHA 10822) LP
 1986 – Stefan Kunev – Favorite Folk Songs & Horos / Стефан Кънев – Любими народни песни и хора (Published by Balkanton BHA 11875) LP
 1986 –  Alexander Kokareshkov – Pirin folk songs / Пирински песни (Published by Balkanton BHA 11786/7) LP
 1999 – Macedonian Folk Tunes / Македонски фолклорни напеви – Album shared with Liyuben & Vessela Bojkovi  (Published by Unison) LP
 2009 – The songs of my father / Песните на Баща ми – Guest in the album of Dimitar Argirov (Published by Double D Music) LP

Personal life 
Iliya Argirov has a son, Dimitar Argirov, who is known as the first singer of rock/metal band Epizod as well as a folklore singer performing the songs from the repertoire of his father.

See also 
 Bulgarian music 
 Pirin Folk Ensemble
 Dimitar Argirov

References 

  "Илия Аргиров отгледа рок певец" – Article in the bulgarian newspaper Standart
  Article on Iliya Argirov and Nadka Karadzova in edition of the Bulgarian National Radio
  Article on the 80th anniversary of Iliya Argirov
  “Iliya Argirov debuts 78 years" – Article on Vesti.bg
  Article on E-Plovdiv
  Press announcement of the Iliya Argirov's death (24 chasa)
  Press announcement of the Iliya Argirov's death(Focus agency)

External links 
 Ansamble Gotse Delchev’s Official site
 Official Myspace
 Official Facebook fanpage
 Bulgarian folklore discography
 Pirin Ensemble's Official site

Bulgarian folk singers
People from Sandanski
Macedonian Bulgarians
20th-century Bulgarian male singers
21st-century Bulgarian male singers